Agnieszka Danuta "Biba" Bibrzycka  (born October 10, 1982) is a basketball player who played for Fenerbahçe Istanbul of the Turkish Women's Basketball League.

Career
 Lotos Gdynia (2001–06)
Polish Championship: 2002, 2003, 2004, 2005
Polish Cup: 2005
 San Antonio Silver Stars (2004–06)
 WBC Spartak Moscow Region (2006–07)
EuroLeague Women: 2007
Russian Championship: 2007
 UMMC Ekaterinburg (2007–11)
Russian Championship: 2009, 2010, 2011
Russian Cup: 2009, 2010, 2011
 CCC Polkowice (2011–12)
 Fenerbahçe Istanbul (2012–present)
Turkish Women's Basketball League: 2012-2013
Turkish Super Cup: 2013, 2014
Turkish Cup: 2015

WNBA
Biba played for the San Antonio Silver Stars  during 2004-05 and 2006-07 seasons.

References

External links
 
 

1982 births
Living people
Fenerbahçe women's basketball players
People from Mikołów
Polish expatriate basketball people in the United States
Polish women's basketball players
San Antonio Stars players
Sportspeople from Silesian Voivodeship
Forwards (basketball)
Guards (basketball)